Ryneldi Becenti (born August 11, 1971) is a retired American professional basketball player. She became the first Native American to play in the WNBA when she played for the Phoenix Mercury in 1997.

High school

Becenti attended Window Rock High School in Fort Defiance, Arizona, and in 1989, Scottsdale Community College in Phoenix. She was the country's top junior college point guard in 1990–91, and left Scottsdale a two-time NJCAA All-American.

College

Becenti was an All-Pac 10 First Team selection in both her seasons at Arizona State University, and a two-time honorable mention All-America honoree. She also turned out for the US at the 1993 World University Games in Buffalo, New York, where her team won the bronze medal.

Professional career

In 1994, Becenti was playing professional basketball in Sweden. She also played in Greece and, briefly, Turkey. In 1997, she signed with the Phoenix Mercury in the WNBA as a free agent and played in their inaugural season. In 1998, she was drafted by the Chicago Condors in the American Basketball League.

Honors

In 1996, she became the first and only female basketball player to be inducted into the American Indian Athletic Hall of Fame.

in 2013, she was the first women's basketball player to have her jersey (No. 21) retired by ASU.

References

External links

2013 Interview for Indian Country Today 
Profile at the American Indian Athletic Hall of Fame
1993 Article from the Sports Illustrated vault

1971 births
Living people
20th-century Native American women
20th-century Native Americans
21st-century Native American women
21st-century Native Americans
American expatriate basketball people in Greece
American expatriate basketball people in Sweden
American expatriate basketball people in Turkey
American women's basketball players
Arizona State Sun Devils women's basketball players
Basketball players from Arizona
Guards (basketball)
Medalists at the 1993 Summer Universiade
Native American basketball players
Navajo sportspeople
People from Fort Defiance, Arizona
Phoenix Mercury players
Scottsdale Community College alumni
Universiade bronze medalists for the United States
Universiade medalists in basketball
United States women's national basketball team players
Native American sportswomen